Ross Dean Browner (March 22, 1954 – January 4, 2022) was an American professional football player who was a defensive end for ten seasons in the National Football League (NFL), mainly for the Cincinnati Bengals. Browner was named to the Bengals' 40th Anniversary Team in 2007.

Early life
Browner was born on March 22, 1954, in Warren, Ohio, where he also grew up. As a child he was primarily interested in swimming and diving, before concentrating on football. He attended Warren Western Reserve High School and during his senior year he was named first-team AAA (big school) all-state defensive end.

College years
Ross Browner was one of the most decorated defensive players in the history of college football. At the University of Notre Dame he was a four-year starter at defensive end in 1973 and 1975–77. He was a unanimous All-America his junior and senior seasons of 1976 and 1977. In 1976, he won the Outland trophy as the nation's best interior or defensive lineman also in 1976 United Press International named him Lineman of the Year. He won the Lombardi Trophy as the nation's best lineman and the Maxwell Award as the nation's best player and again won the UPI Lineman of the Year Award, the only player ever to win it twice. In the decade of the 1970s, Browner was the only lineman who won the Maxwell. In 1977, he also placed fifth in voting for the Heisman Trophy. During his senior year in college, he was featured on the cover of Sports Illustrated with the subheading of "Notre Dame's Peerless Ross Browner."

Notre Dame had a 39–7 record in his time that covered 11–0 in 1973, 8–3 in 1975, 9–3 in 1976, and 11–1 in 1977. Notre Dame won National Championships in 1973 and 1977. His career statistics record 340 tackles, a school record; ten deflected passes, two blocked kicks. He also scored a touchdown and two safeties. Browner was inducted into the College Football Hall of Fame in 1999.

Professional career
He was the first-round draft pick in the 1978 NFL Draft for the Cincinnati Bengals. Voted the team's Most Valuable Player in 1978, he played nine seasons for the Bengals. He set the Super Bowl record for tackles by a defensive lineman in Super Bowl XVI. In 1985, he jumped to the Houston Gamblers of the USFL, but returned the same season to the Bengals. Browner played one season (1987) with the Green Bay Packers before retiring.

Later life and death
After retiring, Browner lived for several years in Mason, Ohio, and worked in sports entertainment, the cleaning industry, insurance, mortgages, and business development. He latterly worked in real estate and lived in Nashville, Tennessee.

Browner was the father of former Pittsburgh Steelers offensive tackle Max Starks and former University of Arizona player Rylan Browner. Ross' brothers are former NFL players Jimmie Browner, Keith Browner and Joey Browner. His nephew, Keith Browner, Jr., played for the Houston Texans.

He died of complications from COVID-19 on January 4, 2022, at the age of 67.

References

1954 births
2022 deaths
African-American players of American football
All-American college football players
American football defensive ends
Notre Dame Fighting Irish football players
Cincinnati Bengals players
Green Bay Packers players
College Football Hall of Fame inductees
Sportspeople from Warren, Ohio
People from Nashville, Tennessee
Players of American football from Ohio
Businesspeople from Ohio
Businesspeople from Tennessee
Houston Gamblers players
Deaths from the COVID-19 pandemic in Tennessee